Dindari or Dindarii, was a tribe that was a branch of the Scordisci. They dwelled by the Drina Valley, of present-day Bosnia and Serbia.

After the Roman conquest of the Scordisci, the civitas of the Dindari was formed (Dindariorum, listed by Pliny the Elder within Dalmatia), whom a fragmentary inscription appears to locate in the Skelani area.

References

Ancient tribes in Bosnia and Herzegovina
Ancient tribes in Serbia
Celtic tribes of Illyria